David William Rankin (February 2, 1919 – December 8, 2006) was an American football player and track athlete and coach.  He was a consensus first-team All-American at the end position at Purdue University in 1940.  He also set a U.S. indoor record in the 60-yard low hurdles in 1940. During World War II, he served as a fighter pilot in the United States Marine Corps.  He later worked as the head coach of the Purdue track team from 1946 to 1981.  He was also an assistant football coach at Purdue in 1947 and 1948.  He was also the U.S. track team coach at the 1975 World University Games. He has been inducted into the Purdue Intercollegiate Athletics Hall of Fame (1998), the Indiana Football Hall of Fame (1977) and the Drake Relays Coaches Hall of Fame (1995).  Rankin died in 2006 at the age of 87.

References

1919 births
2006 deaths
All-American college football players
American football ends
Purdue Boilermakers football players
Purdue Boilermakers football coaches
Purdue Boilermakers men's track and field athletes
Purdue Boilermakers track and field coaches
Players of American football from Indiana
United States Marine Corps pilots of World War II
American World War II fighter pilots